Perez v. Campbell, 402 U.S. 637 (1971), was a case in which the Supreme Court of the United States held that Arizona's law suspending a driver's license was unconstitutional due to its conflict with the federal Bankruptcy Act under the Supremacy Clause of the Constitution.

Background 
The plaintiffs, Mr. Adolfo and Mrs. Emma Perez, were licensed uninsured motorists in the state of Arizona. Insurance was not required under Arizona law. Mr. Perez was involved in a traffic accident and, unable to pay the associated costs, soon filed for bankruptcy. Arizona, under its financial responsibility laws, withdrew the Perez' licenses, and the couple filed suit in district court, where their claim was denied. The Perez family's appeal to the United States Court of Appeals for the Ninth Circuit was denied, and they subsequently appealed to the United States Supreme Court, which granted certiorari.

Opinion of the Court 
Justice White delivered the five-justice majority opinion, which held that the Motor Vehicle Safety Responsibility Act interfered with the purpose of the Bankruptcy Act § 17, a purpose which included giving those exiting bankruptcy the chance for a "clear field for future effort, unhampered by ... pre-existing debt."

This decision overruled precedent in Keeler v. Department of Public Safety, 269 US 153 (1962) and Reitz v. Mealey, 314 US 33 (1941), stating that those rulings "have no authoritative effect to the extent they are inconsistent with the controlling principle that state legislation that frustrates the full effectiveness of federal law is invalidated by the Supremacy Clause.", and was seen as reinforcing "the Hines test", the rule specified for identifying Supremacy Clause violations in Hines v. Davidowitz (1941).

Justice Blackmun, writing for a four-member minority, concurring in part and dissenting in part, would have upheld Keeler and Reitz, suggesting that the primary purpose of the Arizona law was not bankruptcy, but motorist responsibility.

References

External links
 

1971 in United States case law
United States Supreme Court cases
United States Supreme Court cases of the Burger Court